The 2013–14 season was Wigan Athletic's first season back in the Championship (and third overall) after the club's relegation from the Premier League at the end of the 2012–13 season, after eight consecutive seasons in the top flight. For winning the last year's FA Cup they competed in the FA Community Shield and the Europa League for the first time in their history.

Owen Coyle became the manager of Wigan Athletic replacing outgoing manager Roberto Martínez who left for Everton. Coyle left the club on 2 December 2013, and was replaced by Uwe Rösler on 7 December 2013.

Wigan finished fifth in the league, qualifying for the play-offs, where Queens Park Rangers eliminated them in the semi-finals. They also reached the semi-finals of the FA Cup, losing to eventual champions Arsenal. Although Wigan finished bottom of their Europa League group, they had a chance to advance as late as the last matchday away to Maribor.

First team squad
As of 18 March 2014

Transfers

In

Summer

Winter

Out

Summer

Winter

Squad statistics
Statistics accurate as of 12 May 2014
Source:

Top scorers
Statistics accurate as of 12 May 2014

Results

Pre season

Football League Championship

Result and position by match

Football League Championship play-offs

UEFA Europa League

Group stage

FA Cup

League Cup

FA Community Shield

League table

References

Wigan Athletic F.C. seasons
Wigan Athletic F.C.
Wigan